Henri Coenraad Brinkman (Amsterdam, 30 March 1908 – Delft, 11 February 1961) was a Dutch mathematician and physicist. He was a professor at the University of Groningen.

The dimensionless Brinkman number is named after him.

References

1908 births
1961 deaths
20th-century Dutch physicists
20th-century Dutch mathematicians
Academic staff of the University of Groningen